Nanyou station is an interchange station for Line 9 and Line 12 of the Shenzhen Metro. It opened on 8 December 2019 with Line 9, and Line 12 opened on 28 November 2022.

Station layout

Exits

References

External links
 Shenzhen Metro Nanyou station (Chinese)
 Shenzhen Metro Nanyou station (English)

Shenzhen Metro stations
Railway stations in Guangdong
Nanshan District, Shenzhen
Railway stations in China opened in 2019